Ondina anceps (Gaglini, 1992)  is a species of sea snail, a marine gastropod mollusk in the family Pyramidellidae.

Distribution
This species occurs in the following locations:
 European waters (ERMS scope)

References

 Templado, J. and R. Villanueva 2010 Checklist of Phylum Mollusca. pp. 148–198 In Coll, M., et al., 2010. The biodiversity of the Mediterranean Sea: estimates, patterns, and threats. PLoS ONE 5(8):36pp

External links
 To CLEMAM
 To Encyclopedia of Life
 To World Register of Marine Species

Pyramidellidae
Gastropods described in 1992